Andiolava is a town and commune in Madagascar. It belongs to the district of Ihosy, which is a part of Ihorombe Region. The population of the commune was estimated to be approximately 6,000 in 2001 commune census.

Andiolava is served by a local airport. Only primary schooling is available. The majority 70% of the population of the commune are farmers, while an additional 30% receives their livelihood from raising livestock. The most important crop is rice, while other important products are peanuts and cassava.

References and notes 

Populated places in Ihorombe